Mbazzi is a village situated in Mpigi District in Uganda, south of the road to Mityana. The village consists of small farms and a small market place in the central of the village.

History
The first settlers can be traced back to 1830. The first settlers made axes on the hilltops of the area, whereby the village was named axes in Luganda. Back in time the valleys in the area was mainly covered with rainforest and houses were built on the grazing hilltops. Today, the remains of the rainforest are almost extinct.

Agriculture

The major economic activity in Mbazzi, as well as in Mpigi District, is in agriculture. The major crops include:

 Cassava
 Sweet potatoes
 Mangos
 Jackfruit
 Coffee
 Maize
 Matoke
 Bananas
 Avocado
 Beans
 Cotton
 Groundnuts
 Cabbage
 Onions
 Tomatoes

In 2013, the local agriculture cooperative Mbazzi Farmers Association was set up, assisted by the Swedish organization Vi-Agroforestry, with the purpose of promoting agroforestry in Mbazzi. and the vision of safeguarding a sustainable local economy.

See also
 Mpigi District

References

Mpigi District